ICNS can refer to
 Apple Icon Image, uses the extension .icns
 A resource in the resource fork used for icon data
 The International Conference on Nitride Semiconductors